Joachim Eilers (born 2 April 1990) is a German professional racing cyclist. He rode at the 2015 UCI Track Cycling World Championships. At the 2016 UCI Track Cycling World Championships he won gold in the 1 km time trial. He competed for Germany at the 2016 Summer Olympics where he finished 5th in the men's sprint event and 4th in the men's keirin event.

Major results
UCI Track Cycling World Championships
1st Keirin
1st 1km Time Trial
1st Sprinters Omnium, London Six Day.

References

External links

1990 births
Living people
German male cyclists
German track cyclists
Cyclists from Cologne
Olympic cyclists of Germany
Cyclists at the 2016 Summer Olympics
21st-century German people